Li Haozhen (born 3 January 1989) is a former Chinese footballer.

Career statistics

Club

Notes

References

1989 births
Living people
Chinese footballers
Association football defenders
Chinese Super League players
Shanghai Shenxin F.C. players